Star Spell is a BBC game show which put celebrities against each other in spelling related games, each one was subsequently eliminated until there was one Star Spell Champion. It was presented by Eamonn Holmes and was a spin-off from the BBC programme Hard Spell.

Episode list
The one off pilot aired in January 2005 and the eventual title Star Spell Champion was awarded to Richard Whiteley.  After the success of the pilot a series aired in October 2005 and the title of Star Spell Champion was won by Vanessa Feltz.

External links

2005 British television series debuts
2005 British television series endings
2000s British game shows
BBC television game shows